The Regio XII Piscina Publica is the twelfth regio of imperial Rome, under Augustus's administrative reform. Regio XII took its name from the Piscina Publica, a swimming pool that disappeared during the middle imperial period.

Geographic extent and important features

Regio XII was named after the principal feature of this area during the reign of Augustus, the Piscina Publica, a public reservoir and swimming pool, built around the 3rd century BCE. In extent, this region was bordered by the Vicus Piscinae Publicae to the north, the Via Ostiensis to the west, the Via Appia and the Via Latina to the east, and the Aurelian Walls to the south. Its principal gates through the walls were the Porta Appia and the Porta Ardeatina. A measurement taken at the end of the 4th century recorded that the perimeter of the region was 12,000 Roman feet (approximately 3.5 km), making it one of the smaller of the Augustan regions.

The Piscina itself sat in the low-lying area between the Via Appia, the Servian Wall, and the northeast slope of the Aventine Hill. If it was still present, it was eventually destroyed to make way for the monumental Baths of Caracalla in the 3rd century CE, whose massive ruins are still visible.  In addition, the region hosted the Temple of Bona Dea and contained the house of the Roman consul Lucius Fabius Cilo, which was eventually turned into the church of Santa Balbina. Its principal street was the Via Nova, which ran parallel to the Via Appia, and took people from the Circus Maximus to the Baths of Caracalla.

In the 180s, a bank and exchange for Christians operated in this region. The region also contained the station of the fourth cohort of the Vigiles. At the turn of the 5th century, the Regio contained 17aediculae (shrines), 113 domūs (patrician houses), 27 horrea (warehouses), 63 balneae (bath houses) and 81 loci (fountains).

Subdivisions
At the turn of the 5th century, the Regio was divided into 17 vici (districts) and 2,487 insulae (blocks). It had two curators and was served by 48 Roman magistrates.

Notes

References
 Platner, Samuel Ball, A Topographical Dictionary of Ancient Rome, Oxford University Press (1929) (online version)
 Gregorovius, Ferdinand, History of the City of Rome in the Middle Ages, Vol. 1, (1894)
 DISCRIPTIO XIIII REGIONVM VRBIS ROMÆ, Curiosum - Notitia. 4th-century descriptions of the regions of Rome and their main buildings. Archived from the original on 8 June 2019.

Regions of Augustan Rome
Subdivisions of Rome
Topography of the ancient city of Rome